Valentina Blažević (born 14 February 1994) is a Croatian handball player for CS Măgura Cisnădie and the Croatian national team.

She participated at the 2016 European Women's Handball Championship.

References

External links

1994 births
Living people
Croatian female handball players
Sportspeople from Split, Croatia
Sportspeople from Knin
Expatriate handball players in Poland
Croatian expatriate sportspeople in Poland
Croatian expatriate sportspeople in Romania
Croatian expatriate sportspeople in Slovenia
21st-century Croatian women